"Never Be the Same" is the title of the third single by singer-songwriter Christopher Cross, released from his debut Grammy Award-winning album Christopher Cross. It was the singer's third consecutive single to reach the Top 40 on the Billboard Hot 100 chart, where it peaked at number 15 late in 1980. The song was a number-one hit on the adult contemporary chart, remaining there for two weeks.

Chart history

Weekly charts

Year-end charts

See also
List of number-one adult contemporary singles of 1980 (U.S.)

References

External links
 

1980 singles
Christopher Cross songs
Songs written by Christopher Cross
1979 songs
Warner Records singles